The Red River Valley League was a minor league baseball league that played in the 1897 season. The four–team, Class F level Red River Valley League consisted of teams based in North Dakota and Minnesota. The Red River Valley League played just the 1897 season, before permanently folding. The Moorhead Barmaids were league champions.

History
A "Red River Valley League" played several seasons as a semi–pro league before the league evolved to become a full minor league in 1897.

The Red River Valley League began minor league baseball play in the 1897 season as a Class F league. The Four charter teams were the Moorhead Barmaids, Grand Forks Senators/Black Stockings, Wahpeton–Breckenridge Methodists and Fargo Divorcees/Fargo Red Stockings. The league presidents were Chauncey Wheeler and Senator W.A. Gordon, who also served as manager of Grand Forks. Player salaries were capped at $40.00 per month by the league.

The Red River Valley League permanently disbanded on August 8, 1897 eight days after the first–half of the season had ended.

At the time the Red River Valley League folded, on August 8, 1897, the Moorhead Barmaids were in 1st place in the league standings with a 32–13 record. Moorhead was 10.5 games ahead of the 2nd place Grand Forks Senators/Grand Forks Black Stockings (19–21). They were followed by the Wahpeton–Breckenridge Methodists (16–21) and Fargo Divorcees (17–29).

Longest scoreless tie in history
Notably, the River Valley League's Fargo Red Stockings and Grand Forks Black Stockings played a 25–inning, 0–0 tie on July 18, 1891 in the second game of a doubleheader, a 4 hour and 10 minute game. William Gibbs of the Grand Forks Black Stockings, and George Raymer of the Fargo Red Stockings, each pitched a record 25 scoreless innings in the game. The game is the longest scoreless tie in baseball history. The umpire  ended the game after the completion of the 25th inning because the teams had to  catch a train. The 25th inning concluded at 8:10 pm.  The ballgame was played at neutral site. Grand Forks owner Tom Hill relocated the series to the North Dakota State Militia Training Grounds in Devils Lake, North Dakota hoping for larger attendance.

Media
The Red River Valley League was the subject of a book, Divorcees, Barmaids, and Cranks: The 1897 Red River Valley Baseball League by Jeffrey J. Bozovsky.

1897 Red River Valley League teams

Standings & statistics
1897 Red River Valley League

References

External links
Baseball Reference

Defunct minor baseball leagues in the United States
Baseball leagues in North Dakota
Baseball leagues in Minnesota
Sports leagues established in 1897
Sports leagues disestablished in 1897
1897 establishments in the United States
1897 disestablishments in the United States